Taabwa (Ichitaabwa), or Rungu (Malungu), is a Bantu language of Congo and Zambia spoken by half a million or so people.

See also
Taabwa Twa

References

Further reading
 Kalenga, Kaki A. 1992. Esquisse Grammaticale de la Langue Shila, Parler de Nkuba Bukongolo-Lac Moëro. Unpublished thesis, Université de Lubumbashi, DRC. Available Here
 Kavimbwa, Pierre Mutono. 2002. Elements de Phonologie et de Morphologie du Kitaabwa (M41a): Approche Structuraliste. Unpublished thesis, Université de Lubumbashi, DRC. Available Here
 Ntambo, Mwamba. 1984. Aspects Spatio-Temporels en Kitaabwa (M41). Unpublished thesis, Université de Lubumbashi, DRC. Available Here
 Rwakazina, Alphonse-Marie. 1966. Esquisse Grammaticale de la Langue Taabwa: Phonologie et Morphologie. Unpublished thesis, Université  Lovanium,  Faculté  de Philosophie et Lettres, DRC.
 Tumbwe, Kasoro. 1979. Les Emprunts Francais en Taabwa. Unpublished thesis, Institut Supérieur Pédagogique de Kisangani, DRC. Available Here
 van Acker, Auguste. 1907. Dictionnaire Kitabwa-Français et Français -Kitabwa. Annales  du Musée du Congo, Ethnographie et Anthropologie, Série 5: Linguistique, 1:1. Bruxelles: Tervuren. Available Here

Sabi languages
Languages of the Democratic Republic of the Congo
Languages of Zambia